Volkmar Fleischer is a former slalom canoeist who competed for East Germany in the 1960s.

He won a gold medal in the K-1 team event at the 1967 ICF Canoe Slalom World Championships in Lipno.

References
Overview of athlete's results at canoeslalom.net 

German male canoeists
Possibly living people
Year of birth missing (living people)
Medalists at the ICF Canoe Slalom World Championships